A maplet or maplet arrow (symbol: ↦, commonly pronounced "maps to") is a symbol consisting of a vertical line with a rightward-facing arrow.  It is used in mathematics and in computer science to denote functions (the expression x ↦ y is also called a maplet).  One example of use of the maplet is in Z notation, a formal specification language used in software development.

In the Unicode character set, the maplet is at the point U+21A6.

See also

 Arrow notation – e.g., also known as map

References

Mathematical symbols